Hu Yanbin (born 4 July 1983), formerly known as Anson Hu, is a Chinese singer, singer-songwriter, music director, record producer, music educator, and founder of Niuban Music School.

In 1999, he participated in the Shanghai "Asian Music Festival" Newcomer Singer Competition and debuted. 

Hu Yanbin is enthusiastic about social activities. In 2004, he composed and sang the Chinese and English version of the theme song "宣言 (Declaration)" for the "AFC Asian Cup". In 2006, he composed the theme song "And Want You Know" for the "Shanghai International Athletics Gold Grand Prix"

In 2012, he changed his Latin-script stage name to Tiger Hu with the release of his eighth studio album, One Size Bigger.

Discography

Studio albums

Filmography

Film

Variety show

References

External links
 Hu's Sina Micro-Blog (Chinese)
 Hu's Sina Blog (Chinese)
 Hu's Baidu BBS (Forum) (Chinese)
 Tiger Hu (Anson Hu) Fans International (English)
 Tiger Anson Hu Facebook Fan Page (English + Chinese)

1983 births
Living people
Chinese Mandopop singers
Singers from Shanghai
Chinese male singer-songwriters
21st-century Chinese male singers